The St. Cloud Rox are a baseball team that play in the Northwoods League, a collegiate summer baseball league. Their home games are played at the Joe Faber Field in St. Cloud, Minnesota.

Beginnings in Dubuque
The franchise was one of the five founding members of the league in 1994 and was located in Dubuque, Iowa.  The team was nicknamed the Mud Puppies.

Return of baseball to St. Cloud
St. Cloud, Minnesota has hosted baseball for decades at a variety of play levels. Baseball returned to the city in 1997 in the Northwoods League with the relocation of the Mud Puppies.  With the move came a new name for the team, the St. Cloud River Bats.
The River Bats were a premier team in the Northwoods League, winning 3 league championships, one North Division overall championship, and 3 First Half North Division pennants.

Return of the Rox
In February 2012, the Northwoods League sold the team rights to a local interest group while reserving the rights to the name and logo.  The St. Cloud franchise played the 2012 season as the St. Cloud Rox, hearkening back to a popular minor league team that played in the city until 1971.

Radio broadcasts
Rox games can be heard on 1390 Granite City Sports. Jake Lyman, a member of 3304 Sports at Virginia Tech, assumes the broadcasting role for the team.

Notable alumni
 Austin Barnes, Los Angeles Dodgers
 Chris Başak, New York Yankees
 Buddy Baumann, San Diego Padres
 Mark Canha, Oakland Athletics
 Chris Demaria, Kansas City Royals, Milwaukee Brewers
 Thomas Diamond, 10th overall pick of the 2004 MLB Draft, Texas Rangers, Chicago Cubs
 Steve Edlefsen, San Francisco Giants
 John Gaub, Chicago Cubs
 Tom Gorzelanny, Pittsburgh Pirates, Chicago Cubs, Washington Nationals, Milwaukee Brewers, Detroit Tigers, Cleveland Indians
 Justin Huisman, Kansas City Royals
 Chris Jakubauskas, Seattle Mariners, Pittsburgh Pirates, Baltimore Orioles
 Jason Jaramillo, Pittsburgh Pirates
 Sean Kazmar, San Diego Padres
 Roger Kieschnick, San Francisco Giants, Arizona Diamondbacks
 Casey McGehee, Chicago Cubs, Milwaukee Brewers, Pittsburgh Pirates, New York Yankees, Miami Marlins, San Francisco Giants, Detroit Tigers
 Robb Quinlan, Los Angeles Angels of Anaheim
 Tony Renda, Cincinnati Reds
 Matt Reynolds, New York Mets
 Konrad Schmidt, Arizona Diamondbacks
 Jake Smith, San Diego Padres
 Dan Straily, Oakland Athletics, Chicago Cubs, Houston Astros, Cincinnati Reds, Miami Marlins
 Robbie Weinhardt, Detroit Tigers

References

External links
 St. Cloud Rox – official site
 Northwoods League – official site

Northwoods League teams
Amateur baseball teams in Minnesota
1997 establishments in Minnesota
Baseball teams established in 1997
Sports in St. Cloud, Minnesota